Marko Gajić (born 10 March 1992) is a Serbian footballer who plays as a defender for Čukarički.

Career
Born in Belgrade, Gajić started his career at Radnički Nova Pazova. He moved to OFK Beograd in winter break-off 2013–14 season, but after six months he left the club. He made one cup appearance for OFK Beograd. In summer 2014, Gajić signed a three-year contract with Javor Ivanjica. After two seasons he spent with Javor Ivanjica, Gajić moved to Voždovac in summer 2016.

Career statistics

References

External links
 
 

1992 births
Living people
Footballers from Belgrade
Association football defenders
Serbian footballers
Serbian expatriate footballers
FK Radnički Nova Pazova players
OFK Beograd players
FK Javor Ivanjica players
FK Voždovac players
FC U Craiova 1948 players
Serbian First League players
Serbian SuperLiga players
Liga I players
Serbian expatriate sportspeople in Slovenia
Expatriate footballers in Slovenia
Serbian expatriate sportspeople in Romania
Expatriate footballers in Romania
NK Olimpija Ljubljana (2005) players
Slovenian PrvaLiga players
Serbia international footballers